The Money Programme is a finance and business affairs television programme on BBC Two which ran between April 1966 and November 2010. It was first broadcast on 5 April 1966 and presented by "commentators" (financial journalists) William Davis, Erskine B. Childers and Joe Roeber. The programme's theme tune was a version of the main title theme from The Carpetbaggers (1964) (which appeared on an album by jazz organist Jimmy Smith). By 1989, the programme was updated with a new theme by George Fenton.

The programme used a magazine style starting in the 1980s, but changed to a single subject documentary in 2001. More recently the programme has formed a partnership with the Open University Business School. The Open University provides input into programmes and supplementary materials written by OU Business School academics.

On 1 June 2007, an episode of the Money Programme called "Virtual World / Real Millions" became the first full BBC programme to have been broadcast inside the virtual world Second Life. That episode featured an interview with Second Life founder and CEO Philip Rosedale amongst others.

This programme was parodied in Series 3 of Monty Python's Flying Circus as the opening sketch of the third episode in that series first airing on the BBC 3 November 1972.

Presenters

 Max Flint
 Libby Potter

Former presenters
 James Bellini
 Michael Charlton
 Erskine B. Childers
 Adrian Chiles
 Nick Clarke
 Rajan Datar
 William Davis
 Maya Even
 Peter Hobday
 Peter Jay
 Donald MacCormick
 Michael Robinson
 Joe Roeber
 Valerie Singleton
 Hugh Stephenson
 Alan Watson
 Brian Widlake

Interviewees
 Jeff Bezos
 Lord Black of Crossharbour
 Tony Blair
 Michael Bloomberg
 Sir Richard Branson
 Lord Browne of Madingley
 Shiatzy Chen
 Stuart Lowry
 Michael Dell
 Michael Eisner
 Larry Ellison
 Sir Rocco Forte
 Bill Gates
 Sir Chris Gent
 Sir James Goldsmith 
 Sir Philip Green
 Sir Stelios Haji-Ioannou
 Robert Maxwell
 Alexander McQueen
 Lakshmi Mittal
 Rupert Murdoch
 Peter Oakley
 Bernd Pischetsrieder
 Sir Paul Smith
 George Soros
 Sir Alan Sugar
 Björn Ulvaeus
 Robin Winter

References

External links
 
 The Money Programme partnership with Open University
 BBC's Money Programme series to become one-off specials (The Guardian)

1966 British television series debuts
1960s British television series
1970s British television series
1980s British television series
1990s British television series
2000s British television series
2010 British television series endings
BBC Television shows
Business-related television series in the United Kingdom